Miloševo is a village in the municipality of Kruševo, North Macedonia.

Demographics
According to the 2021 census, the village had a total of 42 inhabitants. Ethnic groups in the village include:

Macedonians 42

References

External links

Villages in Kruševo Municipality